Lakamapur is a village in Dharwad district of Karnataka, India.

Demographics 
As of the 2011 Census of India there were 396 households in Lakamapur and a total population of 2,123 consisting of 1,084 males and 1,039 females. There were 293 children ages 0-6.

References

Villages in Dharwad district